A Touch of the Sun is a 1956 British comedy film directed by Gordon Parry and starring Frankie Howerd, Ruby Murray and Dennis Price. Made by the independent producer Raymond Stross it was shot at Walton Studios. The film's sets were designed by the art director John Stoll.

Premise
A hall porter is left a large inheritance by one of the residents. After taking a luxury holiday he takes over the hotel and begins running it himself.

Cast
 Frankie Howerd as William Darling
 Ruby Murray as Ruby
 Dennis Price as Digby Hatchard
 Dorothy Bromiley as Rose Blake
 Katherine Kath as Lucienne
 Gordon Harker as Sid
 Reginald Beckwith as Herbert Hardcastle
 Pierre Dudan as Louis
 Colin Gordon as Cecil Flick
 Richard Wattis as Purchase
 Alfie Bass as May
 Naomi Chance as Miss Caroline Lovejoy
 Miriam Karlin as Alice Cann
 Willoughby Goddard as Golightly
 Aïché Nana as Belly Dancer
 George Margo as Howard Cann
 Esma Cannon as Miss Tickle
 Lucy Griffiths as Aggie

Production
The film was made at Nettlefold Studios, in Walton-on-Thames, in Surrey.

References

External links
 

1956 films
1956 comedy films
British comedy films
Films directed by Gordon Parry
Films scored by Eric Spear
Films shot at Nettlefold Studios
1950s English-language films
1950s British films
British black-and-white films